San Jose College is a private Catholic primary and secondary school, located in Valladolid, in the autonomous community of Castile and León, Spain. The school was founded by the Society of Jesus in 1881 and teaches pre-primary, primary, high school (ESO), and baccalaureate. Designed by Ortiz de Urbina, the school building is considered a good example of the eclecticism of the time.

History
In 1881 the Society of Jesus received an important donation from Justa López Martínez, making it possible to start the Colegio de San José in the now demolished Plazuela del Duque nr. 7, next to the Church of San Juan. A year later in 1882, the Jesuits obtained the land of the Gregorio Remón asked the City Council for permission to expand the campus of the school. The foundation stone was laid on 8 June 1882, the feast of Corpus Christi. The building was completed in 1884 and occupied on January 30, 1885.

Notable alumni   

 Juan Hernández Saravia - General and Minister of Defence during the Second Spanish Republic
 Tomás Villanueva - Vice-president of the Board of Castile and León

Gallery

See also

 Catholic Church in Spain
 Education in Spain
 List of Jesuit schools

References  

Jesuit secondary schools in Spain
Jesuit primary schools in Spain
Buildings and structures in Valladolid
Education in Castile and León
Educational institutions established in 1881
1881 establishments in Spain